Lord William Campbell (11 July 1730 – 4 September 1778) was from a Scottish family loyal to the House of Hanover. His father was John Campbell, 4th Duke of Argyll.

From 1752 to 1760, he served in the Royal Navy in India. In 1762, because of the Seven Years' War, he was scheduled to serve in America. He met and married a lady named Sarah Izard from South Carolina in 1763. His brother-in-law was a future American rebel and member of the Second Continental Congress, Ralph Izard. In 1764, they returned to Britain where he became a member of Parliament, representing the family seat in Argyllshire. In 1766 he was appointed Governor of Nova Scotia, a position he held until 1773.

In June 1775, at the outbreak of the American Revolutionary War, Campbell became the last British Governor of South Carolina, a position for which he had lobbied hard, because his wife was from South Carolina.

Charged with bringing in the reins on the colony's revolutionaries, Campbell first decided to ignore the newly established Provincial Congress. The Provincial Congress was created in January 1775 in Charleston by former members of the South Carolina House of Commons as a separate ruling government independent of British authority and influence. Knowing the great rift between the aristocratic low-country and the backwoodsmen commoners of the backcountry, Campbell distributed pamphlets in mass numbers to backcountry citizens. The pamphlets stated that Charleston citizens kept lying and that the Provincial Congress could not be trusted.

Governor Campbell soon realized he could no longer reside and govern in safety in Charleston. Intimidation from Patriots resulted in public hangings, assaults, and business/home raids of suspected Loyalists. One home raided included that of Henry Laurens, who would go on to become the third President of the Second Continental Congress. Patriots were not afraid to intimidate or attack British officials, and several officials even fled the city to escape further persecution.

In 1775, Campbell fled his home at 34 Meeting Street in Charleston on a British warship, HMS Tamar, and returned to England. His departure marked the beginning of revolution in South Carolina and the end of British governance of the province.

In 1776, during the Battle of Sullivan's Island, he was wounded in action while aboard Sir Peter Parker's flagship, HMS Bristol. He never fully recovered, and died of its effects two years later at age 48.

Literature
The History of South Carolina in the Revolution, (volume i, 1901)
The Carolinian, Rafael Sabatini (1924)

References

External links
Historical Biographies, Nova Scotia: Lord William Campbell (1730-1778)

1730 births
1778 deaths
Governors of the Colony of Nova Scotia
British officials in the American Revolution
Pre-statehood history of South Carolina
Colonial governors of South Carolina
Younger sons of dukes
Royal Navy officers
Royal Navy personnel of the American Revolutionary War
Year of birth uncertain
Members of the Parliament of Great Britain for Scottish constituencies
British MPs 1761–1768
British military personnel killed in the American Revolutionary War